Hirsuteine is an alkaloid isolated from Uncaria and found in Yokukansan. Hirsuteine is an in vitro antagonist of nicotinic receptors.

References

Indole alkaloids
Uncaria
Heterocyclic compounds with 4 rings
Allyl compounds
Quinolizidine alkaloids